This list contains all cultural property of national significance (class A) in the canton of Nidwalden from the 2009 Swiss Inventory of Cultural Property of National and Regional Significance. It is sorted by municipality and contains 11 individual buildings, 2 collections, 3 archaeological finds and 1 other, special site or object.

The geographic coordinates provided are in the Swiss coordinate system as given in the Inventory.

Beckenried

Buochs

Dallenwil

Ennetbürgen

Hergiswil

Stans

Stansstad

Wolfenschiessen

References
 All entries, addresses and coordinates are from:

External links
 Swiss Inventory of Cultural Property of National and Regional Significance, 2009 edition:

PDF documents: Class B objects
Geographic information system